Bolshaya Ivanovka is a rural locality (a selo) and the administrative center of Bolsheivanovskoye Rural Settlement, Ilovlinsky District, Volgograd Oblast, Russia. The population was 1,014 as of 2010. There are 10 streets.

Geography 
Bolshaya Ivanovka is located in steppe, on the left bank of the Berdiya River, on the Volga Upland, 37 km northeast of Ilovlya (the district's administrative centre) by road. Berdiya is the nearest rural locality.

References 

Rural localities in Ilovlinsky District
Tsaritsynsky Uyezd